Digital distribution, also referred to as content delivery, online distribution, or electronic software distribution, among others, is the delivery or distribution of digital media content such as audio, video, e-books, video games, and other software.

The term is generally used to describe distribution over an online delivery medium, such as the Internet, thus bypassing physical distribution methods, such as paper, optical discs, and VHS videocassettes. The term online distribution is typically applied to freestanding products; downloadable add-ons for other products are more commonly known as downloadable content. With the advancement of network bandwidth capabilities, online distribution became prominent in the 21st century, with prominent platforms such as Amazon Video, and Netflix's streaming service starting in 2007.

Content distributed online may be streamed or downloaded, and often consists of books, films and television programs, music, software, and video games. Streaming involves downloading and using content at a user's request, or "on-demand", rather than allowing a user to store it permanently. In contrast, fully downloading content to a hard drive or other forms of storage media may allow offline access in the future.

Specialist networks known as content delivery networks help distribute content over the Internet by ensuring both high availability and high performance. Alternative technologies for content delivery include peer-to-peer file sharing technologies. Alternatively, content delivery platforms create and syndicate content remotely, acting like hosted content management systems.

Unrelated to the above, the term "digital distribution" is also used in film distribution to describe the distribution of content through physical digital media, in opposition to distribution by analog media such as photographic film and magnetic tape (see digital cinema).

Impact on traditional retail
The rise of online distribution has provided controversy for the traditional business models and resulted in challenges as well as new opportunities for traditional retailers and publishers. Online distribution affects all of the traditional media markets including music, press, and broadcasting. In Britain, the iPlayer, a software application for streaming television and radio, accounts for 5% of all bandwidth used in the United Kingdom.

Music
The move towards online distribution led to a dip in sales in the 2000s; CD sales were nearly cut in half around this time. One such example of online distribution taking its toll on a retailer is the Canadian music chain Sam the Record Man; the company blamed online distribution for having to close a number of its traditional retail venues in 2007–08.  One main reason that sales took such a big hit was that unlicensed downloads of music were very accessible. With copyright infringement affecting sales, the music industry realized it needed to change its business model to keep up with the rapidly changing technology.  The step that was taken to move the music industry into the online space has been successful for several reasons.  The development of lossy audio compression file formats such as MP3 could take 30 MB for a typical 3 minute song and bring it down to 3 MB without any serious loss of quality. Lossless FLAC files can be up to six times larger than an MP3 while, in comparison, the same song might require 30–40 megabytes of storage on a CD. The smaller file size yields much greater Internet transfer speeds.

The transition into the online space has boosted sales, and profit for some artists. It has also allowed for potentially lower expenses such as lower coordination costs, lower distribution costs, as well as the possibility for redistributed total profits. These lower costs have aided new artists in breaking onto the scene and gaining recognition. In the past, some emerging artists have struggled to find a way to market themselves and compete in the various distribution channels. The Internet may give artists more control over their music in terms of ownership, rights, creative process, pricing, and more. In addition to providing global users with easier access to content, online stores allow users to choose the songs they wish instead of having to purchase an entire album from which there may only be one or two titles that the buyer enjoys.

The number of downloaded single tracks rose from 160 million in 2004 to 795 million in 2006 which accounted for a revenue boost from US$397 million to US$2 billion.

Videos
Many traditional network television shows, movies and other video content is now available online, either from the content owner directly or from third-party services. YouTube, Netflix, Hulu, Vudu, Amazon Prime Video, DirecTV, SlingTV and other Internet-based video services allow content owners to let users access their content on computers, smartphones, tablets or by using appliances such as video game consoles, set-top boxes or Smart TVs.

Many film distributors also include a Digital Copy, also called Digital HD, with Blu-ray disc, Ultra HD Blu-ray, 3D Blu-ray or a DVD.

Books
Some companies, such as Bookmasters Distribution, which invested US$4.5 million in upgrading its equipment and operating systems, have had to direct capital toward keeping up with the changes in technology. The phenomenon of books going digital has given users the ability to access their books on handheld digital book readers. One benefit of electronic book readers is that they allow users to access additional content via hypertext links. These electronic book readers also give users portability for their books since a reader can hold multiple books depending on the size of its hard drive. Companies that are able to adapt and make changes to capitalize on the digital media market have seen sales surge. Vice President of Perseus Books Group stated that since shifting to electronic books (e-books), it saw sales rise by 68%. Independent Publishers Group experienced a sales boost of 23% in the first quarter of 2012 alone.

Tor Books, a major publisher of science fiction and fantasy books, started to sell e-books DRM-free by July 2012. One year later the publisher stated that they will keep this model as removing DRM was not hurting their digital distribution ebook business. Smaller e-book publishers such as O'Reilly Media, Carina Press and Baen Books had already forgone DRM previously.

Video games 

Online distribution is changing the structure of the video game industry. Gabe Newell, creator of the digital distribution service Steam, formulated the advantages over physical retail distribution as such:

Since the 2000s, there has been an increasing number of smaller and niche titles available and commercially successful, e.g. remakes of classic games. The new possibility of the digital distribution stimulated also the creation of game titles of very small video game producers like Independent game developer and Modders (e.g. Garry's Mod), which were before not commercially feasible.

The years after 2004 saw the rise of many digital distribution services on the PC, such as Amazon Services, Desura, GameStop, Games for Windows – Live, Impulse, Steam, Origin, Battle.net, Direct2Drive, GOG.com, Epic Games Store and GamersGate. The offered properties differ significantly: while most of these digital distributors don't allow reselling of bought games, Green Man Gaming allows this. Another example is gog.com which has a strict non-DRM policy while most other services allow various (strict or less strict) forms of DRM.

Digital distribution is also more eco-friendly than physical. Optical discs are made of polycarbonate plastic and aluminum. The creation of 30 of them requires the use of 300 cubic feet of natural gas, two cups of oil and 24 gallons of water. The protective cases for an optical disc is made from polyvinyl chloride (PVC), a known carcinogen.

Challenges

A general issue is the large number of incompatible data formats in which content is delivered, possibly restricting the devices that may be used, or making data conversion necessary.  Streaming services can have several drawbacks: requiring a constant Internet connection to use content; the restriction of some content to never be stored locally; the restriction of content from being transferred to physical media; and the enabling of greater censorship at the discretion of owners of content, infrastructure, and consumer devices.

Decades after the launch of the World Wide Web, in 2019 businesses were still adapting to the evolving world of distributing content digitally—even regarding the definition and understanding of basic terminology.

See also

 App store
 Digital ecosystem
 Online shopping
 Cloud gaming
 Comparison of digital music stores
 Content delivery network
 Digital distribution of video games
 Ebook
 Electronic publishing
 E-commerce
 Film distribution
 Film distributor
 Internet pornography
 List of Internet television providers
 List of mobile app distribution platforms
 Streaming media
 Video on demand
 Uberisation

References

 
Distribution
Film distribution
Non-store retailing
.
.
Software delivery methods
.
.